Art museums of Ukraine possess many Western European paintings. There, one can see canvases by world-famous artists (such as Titian, Francesco Guardi, Jusepe de Ribera, Diego Velázquez, Peter Paul Rubens) as well as by the painters whose works throughout the world are unique (such as Master of the Osservanza, Jacopo del Sellaio, Jacob Ferdinand Voet, Georges de La Tour and others).

Before the year 1917 
The museum collections of Western European paintings were formed in different ways. Usually they were based on private collections. The collectors often sold or presented pictures they owned to other owners; sometimes (mostly after the 1905 Russian Revolution) large collections were sold abroad.

A number of Ukrainian art lovers spoke out against the export of the artistic wealth and strove for its preservation in public museums and galleries. As early as in the middle of the 19th century, in Ukraine there existed private museums and ‘cabinets of fine arts’ in the universities of Kyiv, Kharkiv, and Odessa. It was due to the public efforts that the first Ukrainian public museum was opened in 1886 in Kharkiv, and the municipal art gallery in Lviv in 1907. Both had large sections of Western European paintings. Some educated people paid their own money to acquire artistic objects which they wanted to donate to their native cities. In such a manner, I. Betsky and A. Alfyorov, graduates of Kharkiv University, started the collection of Western European paintings at the local museum. In Kyiv, it was Bogdan and Varvara Khanenko who in the 1870s began collecting works by Western European artists.

Between the October Revolution and the Great Patriotic War 
After the October Revolution, all artistic works located in Ukraine were nationalised and distributed to museums and art galleries, both to the existing and to the newly formed ones.

But the new rulers kept selling works of art abroad. Besides, Ukrainian museum pieces were being exchanged for far less valuable ones from Russian museums. For example, against Varvara Khanenko’s will, the Bolsheviks split the collection of the Khanenko Museum. Some pieces were sold to the USA for little money that was to be spent on military equipment and arms. Varvara’s will was violated once again after her death when the mention of the Khanenkos disappeared from the name of the museum. After that, it was for a long time called Kyiv Museum of Western and Oriental Art.

In 1925-1926, the museum was enriched with Shchavinsky’s collection of the 17th century pictures by Flemish and Dutch artists.

In 1919, Zhytomyr Local History Museum was created. Its art gallery was based on the Chaudoirs’ collection with a number of first-rate canvases by Western European painters.

The works from the stock of Odessa Committee for the Protection of Monuments of Art and Antiquity and the ones from the metropolitan museums formed Odessa Art Museum. It was opened in 1920. Its present name is Odessa Museum of Western and Eastern Art.

In November 1920, the Crimea having become Soviet, the regional section for the protection of monuments of art and antiquity started work effecting the order of the Crimean Revolutionary Committee. The section was to expropriate and inventory the art treasures from the palaces and mansions of the Crimean South Coast. In December, the objects expropriated formed the basis of Yalta Popular Artistic Museum where Western European authors prevailed. In 1927, Yalta Museum's collection was transferred to the newly created Sevastopol Art Museum. The same year, the museum in Sevastopol received Simferopol Art Museum’s entire collection of Western European art that included a lot of valuable Flemish and Dutch paintings.

After the annexation of Western Ukraine to the USSR in 1939, Lviv Art Gallery was enriched with nationalised private collections containing plenty of wonderful works by Western Europeans.

During the Great Patriotic War 
On June 29, 1941, most pieces from the Kyiv Museum of Western and Oriental Art started being evacuated to Penza and Saratov. But it appeared impossible to move the whole collection. When the Germans came, they started plundering the collection, a process that was put the brakes on for some time only by Dietrich Roskamp who was the keeper of the museum at that time. He protested against the misappropriation of the artistic objects and moving the collection to Germany. But it was hardly possible to fully stop it, and in 1943, due to the Red Army’s advance, the invaders organised the exportation of the collection to Germany. They did it methodically at first, listing and carefully packing the objects, and later hastily and chaotically. Altogether, the Nazis took 474 pictures, 10 sculptures and about 25,000 prints from the museum. Luckily, a few valuable works had managed to be hidden, among them Perugino’s Archangel and Marco Palmezzano’s Madonna with a Saint.

225 works of art were plundered from Lviv Art Gallery during the German invasion, many of them were destroyed. Among them was the unique collection of Dürer’s paintings.

In Kharkiv Art Museum, only five thousand pieces survived.

Before the war, the collection of Poltava Art Museum numbered about 30,000 pieces. The exposition failed to be evacuated and was almost all destroyed. Among the losses was the priceless Western European collection with unique works by Giambattista Tiepolo, Peter Paul Rubens, Melchior d'Hondecoeter, Adriaen van Ostade, Élisabeth Louise Vigée Le Brun and others.

The major part of the objects from Sevastopol Art Museum was evacuated and preserved by its director Mikhail Kroshitsky. After the war, the works of art from Sevastopol Gallery were on display in Simferopol Art Museum for some time, because Sevastopol lay in ruins and the house of the museum had been burnt down.

Only eleven objects of all the pre-war treasures survived in the Art Museum in Donetsk (at that period the name of the city was Stalino).

After World War II 
Kyiv and Odesa have the largest collections that exist as independent museums of western and eastern (oriental) art. The Western European collection in Lviv, though as rich and valuable as those in Odesa and Kyiv, is but a department of the local art gallery. Sections containing a lot of valuable works by Western Europeans exist in art museums of Kharkiv, Sevastopol, and in Zhytomyr Local History Museum. A number of important canvases by foreign artists are possessed by the museums of Poltava, Sumy, Lutsk and Uzhhorod.

Works by famous Western European painters in Ukraine 

Dnipro Art Museum

Batoni, Pompeo Girolamo, Time destroying Beauty

Khanenko Museum

Bellini, Gentile, Portrait of a patrician
Bellini, Giovanni, Madonna and Child
Boucher, François, Cupids
David, Jacques-Louis, Portrait of Lazare Hoche
Hals, Frans, Portrait of Descartes
Luca Giordano, Death of Orpheus
Magnasco, Alessandro, Funeral of a monk
Master of Osservanza, The Crucifixion
Modena, Barnaba da, Scenes from the life of Christ (predella)
Orley, Bernard van, The Execution of St. Catherine
Perugino, Pietro, Madonna and Child
Rubens, Peter Paul, God of the Scheldt River, Cybele and the Goddess of Antwerp (sketch)
Ruysdael, Jacob van, A woodland river
Tiepolo, Giovanni Battista, Summoning of Cincinnatus to the dictatorship (sketch version of the canvas in the Hermitage Museum)
Velázquez, Diego, Portrait of the Infanta Margarita
Vigée-Le Brun, Élisabeth Louise, Portrait of Stanisław August Poniatowski
Weenix the Younger, Jan, Still life with dead hare
Zurbarán, Juan de. Still life with a chocolate mill

Kharkiv Art Museum

Goyen, Jan van, Landscape with fishermen

Lutsk Local History Museum

Ribera, Jusepe de, St. Jerome

Borys Voznytsky Lviv National Art Gallery

Anguissola, Sofonisba, Portrait of a young patrician woman
David, Jacques-Louis, Portrait of the sister of the painter’s wife
Goya, Francisco, Majas on the balcony
Greuze, Jean-Baptiste, A lying girl
Guardi, Francesco, San Giorge Magiore
Guardi, Francesco,  Loggia in Venice
Kauffmann, Angelica, Portrait of Henrick Lubomirski as Cupid
La Tour, Georges de, The payment (At the usurer's)
Liotard, Jean-Étienne, Portrait of Maria Theresa
Luca Giordano, Head of an old man
Magnasco, Alessandro' Landscape
Matejko, Jan, Charles Gustav (Carolus Gustavus) and Szymon Starowolski before the grave of Władysław Łokietek in Warsaw during The Deluge
Matejko, Jan, Portrait of the artist’s children
Mengs, Anton Raphael, Portrait of the engraver B. Bartolozzi
Mengs, Anton Raphael, Portrait of Christoph Friedrich of Saxony
Reni, Guido, Madonna
Ribera, Jusepe de, St. Jerome
Robert, Hubert, Inside a temple
Rubens, Peter Paul,. Portrait of a man
Strozzi, Bernardo, St. Peter curing a paralytic
Titian, Vecellio, Portrait of a man
Vigée-Le Brun, Élisabeth Louise, Portrait of Isabella Lubomirska

Mikhail Kroshitsky Sevastopol Art Museum

Rosa, Salvatore, A castle on the shore of a gulf
Snyders, Frans, Fish on the shore
Wouwerman, Philips, At the watering place

Nikanor Onatsky Regional Art Museum in Sumy

Bellotto, Bernardo, The city square
Goyen, Jan van, Dutch landscape with a house at the road
Robert, Hubert, Ruins with an arch
Vigée-Le Brun, Élisabeth Louise, Portrait of Countess Litta

Odessa Museum of Western and Eastern Art

Batoni, Pompeo Girolamo, Venus and Cupid
Berchem, Nicolaes Pieterszoon, Landscape with a herd
Caravaggio, Michelangelo Merisi da, Taking of Christ (stolen in 2008, recovered in 2010)
Daubigny, Charles-François, Landscape (study)
Goyen, Jan van, Winter landscape
Hals, Frans, Luke the Evangelist
Hals, Frans, Matthew the Evangelist
Leyden, Lucas van, David and Abigail
Magnasco, Alessandro, Monks shaving
Magnasco, Alessandro, Landscape with figures of people
Magnasco, Alessandro, Corps de garde
Magnasco, Alessandro, St. Jerome
Magnasco, Alessandro, Mary Magdalene
Robert, Hubert, The Maison Carrée in Nîmes
Sustermans, Justus, Portrait of a lady wearing pearls
Teniers the Younger, David, Man smoking

Poltava Art Museum

Lampi, Franz, Portrait of a man
Peeters, Clara, Still life

Yosyp Bokshay Transcarpathian Regional Museum of Art

Hoogstraten, Samuel van, Portrait of a man wearing a beret

Zhytomyr Local History Museum

Carracci, Agostino, Portrait of the artist’s brother Annibale Carracci
Liotard, Jean-Étienne Portrait of a woman
Luca Giordano, Christ talks to the Samaritan woman
Piombo, Sebastiano del, Portrait of Michelangelo
Robert, Hubert, Laocoön Gallery in the Louvre

References 

 West-European Painting of the 14th-18th centuries (the Ukrainian title: Західноєвропейський живопис 14−18 століть). A picture album. − Kyiv, "Mystetstvo" Publishing House, 1981 (in Ukrainian, Russian, and English)

External links 
 Kharkiv Art Museum. The official website
 Transcarpathian Regional Museum of Art. The official website
 Sevastopol Art Museum official website 
 Ukrainian museums and pictures from their expositions
 An Internet catalogue of Ukrainian museums 

Western European paintings
Paintings in Ukrainian museums
Collections of museums in Ukraine
Lists of paintings
Ukraine-related lists